Geoffrey Bull (1 August 1912 – 20 January 1997) was an English cricketer. He played first-class cricket for Delhi and Northern India between 1935 and 1942.

See also
 List of Delhi cricketers

References

External links
 

1912 births
1997 deaths
English cricketers
Delhi cricketers
Northern India cricketers
Place of birth missing